Guy-Marc Michel (born October 4, 1988) is a French professional basketball player. He is a 2.16 m (7 ft 1 in) tall center.

College career
Michel played college basketball at Northern Idaho College from 2008 to 2010. He also enrolled to play college basketball at Indiana, with the Indiana Hoosiers, from 2010 to 2011, but he was declared ineligible by the NCAA, due to having previously played professionally in France.

Professional career
Michel started his pro career in 2008, during the 2007–08 season, with the French League club SLUC Nancy. He then moved to the US to play college basketball. After playing college basketball in the US, he joined the Greek League club KAOD in 2011.

In 2013, he signed with the Greek club Panionios. He moved back to KAOD in 2014.

References

External links
Eurocup Profile
FIBA Europe Profile
Eurobasket.com Profile
Greek League Profile 
French League Profile 
Draftexpress.com Profile
Indiana Hoosiers College Bio

1988 births
Living people
Centers (basketball)
French expatriate basketball people in the United States
French men's basketball players
Junior college men's basketball players in the United States
K.A.O.D. B.C. players
Lille Métropole BC players
Panionios B.C. players
SLUC Nancy Basket players